Viaplay Group AB, formerly known as Nordic Entertainment Group AB (NENT Group), is a Swedish media and entertainment company headquartered in Stockholm.

The company operates the namesake video streaming services Viaplay and Viafree, advertising-funded TV and radio channels, the V pay-TV channels, as well as the studio production company Viaplay Studios. Viaplay Group was founded in 2018 as a spinoff from MTG. Viaplay Group's first day as a publicly traded company was on 28 March 2019 listed on the Stockholm Stock Exchange.

History
In March 2018, the Stockholm-headquartered entertainment company Modern Times Group (MTG) initiated a process to split into two companies by spinning off its then Nordic Entertainment and MTG Studios business segments plus Splay Networks into a new company. This was initiated after Danish telecommunications operator TDC A/S, which had proposed to buy these assets a month earlier, was itself acquired by the Australian private equity investor Macquarie Group. Anders Jensen, MTG Executive Vice President and CEO of Nordic Entertainment, was named president and CEO of NENT Group.

NENT Group began operating separately on 1 July 2018. On 28 March 2019, shares in Nordic Entertainment Group started trading on Nasdaq Stockholm exchange.

NENT Group took a stake in Erik Feig's Picturestart studio along with first look Nordic rights to its content at Picturestart's May 2019 launch.

On 5 May 2020, Pay-TV satellite platform Viasat, which was previously owned by NENT Group, merged with Canal Digital to form Allente. The merger means that NENT Group and Telenor Group owns Allente TV 50% each, but it operates on its own as an independent company. Through the merger, NENT Group's channels, including the V channels, were made available on Allente's platform. NENT Group operated Pay-TV, the Viasat satellite platform in Scandinavia and offered both in-house and third party channels.

On 13 April 2021, the merger of Canal Digital and Viasat in Allente was completed.

On 16 September 2021, NENT Group announced the re-organisation of its studio operations, previously called NENT Studios, as Viaplay Studios. With Viaplay Studios, the company announced that the main focus of the studio operations onwards is content production for the Viaplay streaming platform.

On 18 May 2022, the company's shareholders approved the change of the company's name to Viaplay Group. In July 2022, Viaplay Group acquired U.K.-based sports streamer and pay TV channel operator, Premier Sports, for $36 million

Company structure

Streaming services in the Nordics – Viaplay and Viafree 
Viaplay Group operates the streaming service (SVOD) Viaplay, which launched as Viasat OnDemand in Sweden 2007, in 2011 it was rebranded Viaplay.

Viaplay Group also operates Viafree, a free streaming service (AVOD) in Denmark, Finland, Norway and Sweden. On 29 November 2021, NENT Group announced that Viafree will soon to be part of Paramount Global (under Pluto TV), with the announcement that the said AVOD streamer will be integrated into Pluto TV on 18 May 2022.

On 1 April 2020, Viaplay launched in Iceland, as the final Nordic market to launch the streaming service, making Viaplay available in all Nordic countries, which was first announced in 2019.

On 24 June 2020, Viaplay's Finnish service merged with rival Elisa Viihde Aitio, owned by Elisa, to form Elisa Viihde Viaplay.

Viaplay international expansion 
At NENT Group's Capital Markets Day in November 2020, the company presented its 5-year expansion plan, with targets of 10 added international markets by 2023 (to a total of 15 markets) and a total of 10.5 Million subscribers by 2025. On the following year's CMD, in 2021, NENT Group raised the targets to launching Viaplay on at least 16 markets by 2023 and had the subscription target raised to 12 Million subscribers by 2025.

On 11 February 2021, NENT Group announced that the company had raised SEK 4.35 Billion to support the company's vision of launching Viaplay on 10 markets by the end of 2023, in line with the communicated expansion plan which was announced on the company's 2020 Capital Markets Day. Poland and the US were presented as two of the new markets, along with Estonia, Latvia and Lithuania that had already announced.

On 9 March 2021, Viaplay launched in the Baltics, adding Estonia, Latvia and Lithuania.

On 20 May 2021, NENT Group announced the launch of Viaplay in the Netherlands in the first quarter of 2022 with exclusive Formula One, Bundesliga and Professional Darts Corporation darting events rights. Less than two months later, the company also announced that it had acquired the rights to the English Premier League in the Netherlands.

On 3 August 2021, NENT Group launched Viaplay in Poland with premium sports rights, and announced the three first Viaplay Originals’ productions in Polish – Polish Murderesses, Black Dog and Freedom of the Swallow.

On 22 September 2021, Nordic Entertainment Group announced that Viaplay will launch in at least 16 markets by end of 2023, including the UK in the second half of 2022, and Canada, Germany, Austria and Switzerland in 2023.

In July 2022, Viaplay Group has announced that they're officially acquired Premier Sports prior to the UK launch. The channel, which also include FreeSports, will soon to be rebrand as Viaplay Sports network.

Advertising funded television (Free-TV)

Viaplay Group operates advertising funded channels in Scandinavia. Typically, the portfolio structure for these channels is one primary channel (TV3), and then secondary channels (TV6, TV3+ etc...) These channels generate primarily advertising revenues, and are classified as free-TV, but are encrypted and subject to decoding fees.

Networks

Pay television

TV services

On 5 May 2020, the merger between Canal Digital and Viasat Consumer was completed, and formed Allente - the Viasat satellite platform in Scandinavia, offering both in-house and third party channels. By owning a 50% stake in the TV distributor Allente, Nordic Entertainment Group  distributes its pay-TV channels including V sports, V series and V film in Scandinavia.

The sports channels available in the different Scandinavian countries differ somewhat depending on different rights held for different markets and different business agreements.

The following channels are available in each country:

Radio
Viaplay Group owns several radio networks and stations in Sweden and Norway:

Viaplay Studios
Viaplay Studios consists of the following companies as of 30 September 2021:

Viaplay Studios Sweden (formed from merger of Brain Academy and Nice Drama)
Splay One (Denmark/Finland/Norway/Sweden)
Strix Television (Netherlands/Belgium)
EPIQ (Denmark)
Paprika Studios (Hungary/Czech Republic/Slovakia/Romania/Bulgaria/Slovenia/Estonia/Latvia/Lithuania)
Viaplay Studios Animation

On 29 January 2020, NENT Studios announced that they were looking to sell off their unscripted labels to focus on scripted productions. However, the attempts were interrupted by the COVID-19 pandemic, before NENT Studios decided to resume them shortly after changing the name of their British division DRG to NENT Studios UK on 30 April of that year. All3Media would later acquire NENT Studios UK on 11 June 2021 and merge it into their All3Media International division, while Fremantle would later that they would take over NENT's unscripted operations the following month; the acquisition was completed at the end of September 2021. On 16 September 2021 (2 weeks before Fremantle acquired NENT's unscripted labels), NENT Studios was renamed Viaplay Studios and restructured to produce content for the Viaplay SVOD service, with Brain Academy and Nice Drama being merged to form Viaplay Studios Sweden and NENT Studios Animation renamed Viaplay Studios Animation.

References

External links

Mass media companies of Sweden
Television networks in Sweden
Television in Denmark
Television in Sweden
Television in Norway
2018 establishments in Sweden